Mount Dzhalil' is a small mountain,  high, in the Linnormen Hills of the Payer Mountains, in Queen Maud Land. It was mapped from air photos and surveys by the Sixth Norwegian Antarctic Expedition, 1956–60. It was remapped by the Soviet Antarctic Expedition, 1960–61, and named after Musa Dzhalil', the Soviet poet.

References 

Mountains of Queen Maud Land
Princess Astrid Coast